Henry Joseph Soenneker (May 27, 1907—September 24, 1987) was an American prelate of the Roman Catholic Church. He served as the second bishop of the Diocese of Owensboro in Kentucky from 1961 to 1982.

Biography

Early life 
Henry Soenneker was born in Melrose, Minnesota, to Henry and Mary (née Wessel) Soenneker. He studied at the Pontifical College Josephinum in Columbus, Ohio, obtaining a Bachelor of Arts degree in 1930.

Priesthood 
Soenneker was ordained to the priesthood by Bishop James Hartley for the Diocese of St. Cloud on May 26, 1934. After his ordination, Soenneker was appointed as curate at St. Anthony Parish in St. Cloud, Minnesota,.  He also served as a high school teacher and chaplain at a Veterans Administration hospital.

In 1940, Soenneker left his current positions to become chaplain to the Sisters of St. Francis at Little Falls, Minnesota. He travelled in 1948 to Washington D.C. to attend the Catholic University of America, earning a Licentiate of Canon Law in 1950. After returning to Minnesota, he was named spiritual director of St. John's Seminary in Collegeville.

Bishop of Owensboro 
On March 10, 1961, Soenneker was appointed the second bishop of the Diocese of Owensboro by Pope John XXIII. He received his episcopal consecration on  April 26, 1961, from Bishop Peter Bartholome, with Bishops Francis Schenk and Joseph Mueller serving as co-consecrators. Soenneker attended all four sessions of the Second Vatican Council in Rome between 1962 and 1965.

Pope John Paul II accepted Soenneker's resignation as bishop of the Diocese of Owensboro on June 30, 1982. Henry Soenneker died in Owensboro on September 24, 1987, at age 80.  The Bishop Soenneker Home, an assisted living facility in Knottsville, Kentucky, was named after him.

References

Episcopal succession

1907 births
1987 deaths
Participants in the Second Vatican Council
People from Melrose, Minnesota
Pontifical College Josephinum alumni
Roman Catholic Diocese of Owensboro
Catholic University of America alumni
20th-century Roman Catholic bishops in the United States
Religious leaders from Kentucky
Catholics from Minnesota